Mohamed Harbi (born June 16, 1933) is an Algerian historian who was a member of the FLN during the Algerian War of Independence.

Mohamed Harbi was born in 1933 into a wealthy family in El Harrouch, Algeria. At the age of 15, he joined the MTLD (ex.PPA). According to his later memoirs, Harbi lived underground in France and gathered support for the Algerian independence. 1954-1962 he was in a prominent position in the FLN.

After the Algerian War of Independence, he became an advisor to new president, Ahmed Ben Bella and later a member of his cabinet. Harbi's Marxism was fiercely opposed by many veterans of the war, as well as by the army. According to his memoirs, Harbi tried to resist the increasingly authoritarian approach of the new government and urged Ben Bella to arm the people to avert a military coup. He believed, like many Marxists in his generation, that popular militias were needed to revolutionize society as well as resist the impending coup. However, his own insistence on Marxist dogma helped fuel popular as well as political opposition toward him, which culminated in the very coup he had feared.

In June 1965 Houari Boumedienne seized power and arrested Ben Bella. Two months later Harbi was also imprisoned. For the next six years he was transferred between prisons until he was placed in house arrest in 1971. In 1973 he escaped to Tunisia with a false Turkish passport and from there moved to Paris.

In France, Harbi began to teach political science in the University of Paris.

During his house arrest, Harbi had begun to write the history of the independence movement and in 1975 published a book The history of FLN. His inside view of the movement was not the one FLN cherished and he began to receive death threats from three sides; Algerian secret police, Algerian Islamic militants and French ultra nationalists.

Currently Harbi lives in Paris, retired from the university. The first part of his memoirs was published in 2003.

External links
 copy of a New York Times article "An Arab Gadly With a Memorable Bite"

1933 births
Living people
Algerian historians
Historians of Africa
Members of the National Liberation Front (Algeria)
People from Skikda Province
Academic staff of the University of Paris
21st-century Algerian people